The spotted legskate (Anacanthobatis marmoratus) is a species of fish in the family Anacanthobatidae. It is found off Mozambique and South Africa. Its natural habitat is open seas.

References

External links
 Species Description of Anacanthobatis marmoratus at www.shark-references.com

Anacanthobatis
Fish described in 1923
Taxonomy articles created by Polbot
Taxobox binomials not recognized by IUCN